The Bundesanzeiger is an official publication of the Federal Republic of Germany published by the German department of Justice with a scope similar to that of the Federal Register in the United States. It is used for announcing laws, mandatory legal and judicial announcements, announcing changes in the Handelsregister and for legally mandated announcements by the private sector. It is being superseded by the elektronischer Bundesanzeiger (eBAnz) (electronic Bundesanzeiger) in recent years.

Bundesanzeiger is published by Cologne-based M. DuMont Schauberg.

External links
 

Government gazettes
Government of Germany